Central Township is an inactive township in Franklin County, in the U.S. state of Missouri.

Central Township was named for its location near the geographical center of Franklin County.

References

Townships in Missouri
Townships in Franklin County, Missouri